Glotovo (Slöböda) is a village in the Komi Republic, Russia, located on the Mezen River.

References

Rural localities in the Komi Republic